Asia Muhammad and Taylor Townsend were the defending champions, having won the last edition in 2019, however both players chose not to participate.

Anna Danilina and Arina Rodionova won the title, defeating Erin Routliffe and Aldila Sutjiadi in the final, 6–1, 6–3.

Seeds

Draw

Draw

References
Main Draw

Boar's Head Resort Women's Open - Doubles